Dark Continent is the debut studio album by American rock band Wall of Voodoo, released in 1981 by I.R.S. Records. Early live versions of four songs ("Red Light", "Animal Day", "Back in Flesh" and "Call Box (1-2-3)") are featured on the compilation The Index Masters.

Reception

In a 1981 Trouser Press review, Jon Young said, "[t]his deadpan opus is either a joke or just another pretentious search for meaning." He continued, "Wall of Voodoo will need a better sense of the absurd to attain true strangeness. Here they just don't go far enough." In a later review from The Trouser Press Guide to New Wave Records (1983), Young stated that Dark Continent displayed "more polish" than the band's debut EP and benefited from "colorfully morose guitar and keyboards."

In a retrospective review, Greg Adams of AllMusic declared Dark Continent to be Wall of Voodoo's greatest album, pointing to the uniformly strong songwriting and the intensely original voice and style. Conversely, Geoff Barton of Classic Rock magazine opined that the first two Wall of Voodoo albums did not age well; he found Ridgway's singing style "intensely irritating" and the music "too clever-clever for comfort."

Dark Continent reached number 177 on the Billboard 200 chart.

Promotion
A music video was produced for the song "Call Box (1-2-3)". The band performed "Back in Flesh" in the 1981 concert film Urgh! A Music War.

Reissues
The album was first issued on CD by A&M Records in 1992. In 2009, Australian label Raven Records reissued Dark Continent and the second Wall of Voodoo album, Call of the West, together on one CD, featuring a full color booklet with liner notes by Ian McFarlane. Both albums were digitally remastered.

Track listing
All tracks written by Wall of Voodoo.
Side one
 "Red Light" – 3:08
 "Two Minutes Till Lunch" – 2:55
 "Animal Day" – 3:13
 "Full of Tension" – 2:14
 "Me and My Dad" – 3:20
 "Back in Flesh" – 3:42

Side two
 "Tse Tse Fly" – 4:46
 "Call Box (1-2-3)" – 2:32
 "This Way Out" – 3:56
 "Good Times" – 2:29
 "Crack the Bell" – 3:33

Personnel
Wall of Voodoo
Stanard Ridgway – vocals, keyboards, harmonica
Marc Moreland – guitar
Bruce Moreland – bass guitar, keyboards
Chas Gray – keyboards, synthesizers
Joe Nanini – drums, percussion

Technical
Jim Hill – co-producer, co-engineer
Paul McKenna – co-producer, co-engineer
Wall of Voodoo – co-producer
Kirk Ferraioli – assistant engineer
Scott Lindgren – photographs
Phillip Culp – art direction, design

References

External links
 Raven Records page for Dark Continent / Call of the West

Wall of Voodoo albums
1981 debut albums
I.R.S. Records albums